The 1989 Athens Open was a men's tennis tournament played on outdoor clay courts in Athens in Greece that was part of the 1989 Nabisco Grand Prix. It was the fourth edition of the tournament and was held from 10 April through 16 April 1989. Second-seeded Ronald Agénor won the singles title.

Finals

Singles

 Ronald Agénor defeated  Kent Carlsson 6–3, 6–4
 It was Agénor's only singles title of the year and the 1st of his career.

Doubles

 Claudio Panatta /  Tomáš Šmíd defeated  Gustavo Giussani /  Gerardo Mirad 6–3, 6–2
 It was Panatta's only title of the year and the 7th of his career. It was Šmíd's 2nd title of the year and the 62nd of his career.

See also
 1989 Athens Trophy – women's tournament

References

External links
 ITF tournament edition details

Athens Open
Athens Open
ATP Athens Open
April 1989 sports events in Europe